The Asia-Pacific Regional Conference on Service-Learning (APRCSL) was established as a platform for educational institutions and non-profit organizations in the Asia-Pacific region to share knowledge and experiences in service-learning.

In the face of increasing societal and environmental challenges, the need to influence and empower our youths to actively develop and act on their sense of social responsibility is ever pressing. In both academic and co-curricular applications, Service-Learning plays a critical role in tertiary institutions in educating and engaging our youths to develop the knowledge and skills (Head), attitudes and dispositions (Heart) to make life choices that are socially responsible (Habit), in their journey of growth to become leaders in society.

Locations 
The conferences were held biennially.

Past speakers

See also
Service-learning

References

Learning
Youth conferences
Academic conferences